"The Keys" is the 40th episode of the sitcom Seinfeld. It is the 23rd, and final, episode of the third season and the first of a three-episode story arc. It first aired on May 6, 1992. In this episode, Jerry takes back his spare keys from Kramer, straining their friendship. Candice Bergen guest stars as herself, playing the title character from Murphy Brown (as she did in real life) in a TV episode within a TV episode.

Plot
In a montage of incidents, Jerry returns home to find that Kramer has overstayed his welcome; he had been using the spare set of keys Jerry left with him. Exasperated, Jerry demands his spare keys back. The loss of the keys makes Kramer first rueful and then philosophically resigned. Disturbed by the change in him, Jerry tries to give the keys back, but Kramer refuses. Kramer then leaves for California to follow his dream of becoming an actor, after he is unable to persuade George to join him.

Jerry gives his spare keys to Elaine. Soon after, he needs them and goes to Elaine's apartment with George (who has the spare keys to her place), to search for his spare set. While there, they find Elaine's writing project for an episode of Murphy Brown. As they read and laugh over it, Elaine walks in. Despite their positive assessment of her script, she screams at them to leave because they have invaded her privacy.

During his travel to California, Kramer gets in a series of misadventures: his car breaks down, he hitchhikes three times (first with a motorcyclist, then a Volkswagen filled with hippies, and finally a truck driver), and at last resorts to rollerskating on Venice Beach in Los Angeles.

Jerry is unable to locate Kramer to make amends. One night, while watching Murphy Brown with Elaine, Jerry sees Kramer in a bit part on Murphy Brown as Murphy's new secretary, "Steven Snell".

Production
Larry David and Jerry Seinfeld later appeared on Diane English's (creator of Murphy Brown) new show, Love & War, as a thank you for the Murphy Brown scene. 
Due to Julia Louis-Dreyfus's off-screen pregnancy, her character had to spend the latter half of this season hiding her belly behind furniture and laundry baskets. "The Keys" was the final episode filmed before the birth of her son and her leave at the start of Season 4.

Music
When Jerry calls Kramer's mother, the music heard in the background is from Pagliacci, which was later featured in the episode "The Opera".  The scene that shows Kramer rollerskating in L.A. is accompanied by an instrumental version of The Beach Boys' song "California Girls".

References

External links 
 

Seinfeld (season 3) episodes
1992 American television episodes